The Sports List is an American television news show in which Summer Sanders counted down top ten lists of various sports topics. The show was first broadcast on August 1, 2004, on Fox Sports Net (FSN) and the last episode was shown on September 7, 2004. Sanders started the show by explaining the topic and then counted up the list from ten to one. During each segment, there were celebrities or sports analysts giving their input on each item. Topics included "Best Athletes Without Rings", "The Best Shortstops", and "The Most Hated People In Sports". The show is occasionally repeated on FSN.

The Sports List topics

Ice hockey
Ten Reasons The Capitals are Bad
The Greatest Hockey Players of All-Time
Greatest Slap Shots ever

American football
The Greatest Quarterbacks of the 1980s Joe Montana
The Greatest Quarterbacks of the 1990s Steve Young, Troy Aikman
The Greatest Wide Receivers of All-Time Jerry Rice 
The Greatest Running Backs of All-Time Jim Brown
The Toughest Football Players of All-Time Jack Lambert
The Greatest Linebackers of All-Time Lawrence Taylor

Other
The Greatest Non-Existent Sports Comparisons
The Greatest Buzzer Beaters
The Greatest Dynamic Duos
The Greatest Sports Dynasties
The Craziest Athletes
The Greatest Pro-Rivalries of All-Time
The Greatest Individual Streaks
The Greatest Individual Comebacks
Bizarre Moments
Shocking Upsets
Greatest Out of Shape Athletes
Best Athletes Without a Ring
Athletes Who Hung On Too Long
Most Hated People in Sports
Broadcasters
Funny moments
Greatest Flukes of All-Time 
Sexiest Athletes (Sanders was an "honorable mention" on the show and blushed when her name appeared.)
Unbreakable Records
Best Clutch Athletes
Greatest Sports Heroes

Frequent guests
 Dave Coulier
 Richard Lewis
 Tom Arnold
 Derek Jeter
 Sammy Sosa
 Emeka Okafor
 Tony Hawk
 Jim Belushi
 Michael Chiklis
 Al Michaels
 Mike Ditka
 Ben Maller
 Michael Ian Black
 Keyshawn Johnson
 Michael Irvin

External links
AmIAnnoying.com Collections - The Sports List

Fox Sports Networks original programming
2000s American television talk shows
2004 American television series debuts
2004 American television series endings